Sociedade Desportiva Sparta, commonly known as Sparta, is a Brazilian football club based in Araguaína, Tocantins state.

Sparta is currently ranked fifth among Tocantins teams in CBF's national club ranking, at 205th place overall.

Stadium
Rondoniense play their home games at Mirandão. The stadium has a maximum capacity of 10,000 people.

Honours
Campeonato Tocantinense Second Division: 1
2016

References

External links
 Official website

Association football clubs established in 2006
Sparta
2006 establishments in Brazil